Hopkins is an English and Welsh patronymic surname.

Hopkins may also refer to:

Places

 Hopkins Island, South Australia
 Hopkins, Belize

In the United States:
 Hopkins, California was the name of Soda Springs, Nevada County, California
 Hopkins, Michigan
 Hopkins, Minnesota
 Hopkins, Missouri
 Hopkins, South Carolina
 Hopkins County, Kentucky
 Hopkins County, Texas
 Hopkins Township, Whiteside County, Illinois
 Hopkins Township, Michigan

Education
In the United States:
 Johns Hopkins University, located in Baltimore, Maryland
 Johns Hopkins Blue Jays, the school's athletic program
 Johns Hopkins Hospital
 Johns Hopkins School of Medicine
 Johns Hopkins Bloomberg School of Public Health
 Hopkins School, New Haven, Connecticut
 Hopkins Academy, public school in Hadley, MA
 Hopkins Junior High School, public school in Fremont, California
 Hopkins Public Schools (Michigan), school district in Michigan
 Hopkins Public Schools (Minnesota), school district serving the Twin Cities in Minnesota
 Hopkins High School, in the Hopkins Public Schools District

Other uses
 Hopkins (TV series), television documentary about doctors at Johns Hopkins Hospital
 Hopkins Architects, international architecture practice based in London and Dubai
 Cleveland Hopkins International Airport, located in Cleveland, Ohio, USA
 Hopkins Rides Inc, amusement ride manufacturer
 Justice Hopkins (disambiguation)